Victor Clarence Porteous (5 November 1893 – 17 June 1966) was a National Government and Conservative member of the House of Commons of Canada. He was born in Derby Township, Ontario and became a farmer.

Porteous attended school at Owen Sound Collegiate and Vocational Institute, then college. In 1929 and 1930, he was a member of Derby Township council.

He was elected to Parliament at the Grey North riding in the 1930 general election, defeating incumbent Liberal member William Pattison Telford, Jr. After serving one term, he was defeated by Telford in the 1935 election. Porteous made another attempt to win the seat back in the 1940 election under the National Party banner but was also unsuccessful.

References

External links
 

1893 births
1966 deaths
Canadian farmers
Conservative Party of Canada (1867–1942) MPs
Members of the House of Commons of Canada from Ontario
Ontario municipal councillors